The Soviet Union's 1988 nuclear test series was a group of 16 nuclear tests conducted in 1988. These tests  followed the 1987 Soviet nuclear tests series and preceded the 1989 Soviet nuclear tests series.

References

1988
1988 in the Soviet Union
1988 in military history
Explosions in 1988